"Searching" is the third and final single by Pete Rock & CL Smooth from their album, The Main Ingredient. This is a downtempo and mellow song about relationships, with singer Vinia Mojica performing the chorus. Released just prior to the breakup of the group, the song received very little promotion. It was remixed and re-released at the beginning of 1996. The song features samples from the Roy Ayers song "Searching".

Track listing
Original release
 Side A
1. "Searching" (LP Version - Clean Edit) (4:10)
 Side B
2. "Searching" (LP Instrumental) (4:53)

Rerelease
 Side A
1. "Searching" (LP Version)
2. "Searching" (Remix)
3. "Searching" (LP Instrumental)
 Side B
1. "We Specialize" (Ft. YGz) 
2. "We Specialize" (Acappella)
3. "Searching" (Remix Instrumental)

Pete Rock songs
1995 singles
1994 songs
Elektra Records singles
Song recordings produced by Pete Rock